Götschetal-Petersberg was a Verwaltungsgemeinschaft ("collective municipality") in the Saalekreis district, in Saxony-Anhalt, Germany. It was situated north of Halle (Saale). The seat of the Verwaltungsgemeinschaft was in Götschetal. It was disbanded in January 2010.

The Verwaltungsgemeinschaft Götschetal-Petersberg consisted of the following municipalities:

 Brachstedt 
 Götschetal
 Krosigk 
 Kütten 
 Morl 
 Ostrau 
 Petersberg

References

Former Verwaltungsgemeinschaften in Saxony-Anhalt